The Strategem of Peshawar was a campaign of the Durrani empire lead by Azim Khan Barakzai against the Nawab of Amb , Mir Nawab Khan Tanoli. Azim Khan who was the half brother of Dost Muhammad Khan , the King of Afghanistan.

Azim Khan invited Mir Nawab to settle the dispute between Amb and Durrani but Azim Khan was ready for battle there. Azim Khan who cheated on his speech. When Mir Nawab and his few soldiers reached Jamrud. Azim Khan attacked Mir Nawab's army by making circle around their army and hence the army of Mir Nawab can't settled the war position against the guns and cannon of Azim Khan Barakzai. 

As result, Mir Nawab khan Tanoli killed and a lot of loss to the Kingdom of Amb who already facing so much war against Sikh Empire and Nawab of Amb lose their territory and wiped out.

Main Reason Behind war 
The main reason for the war was that when Azim Khan's mother was traveling to Kashmir via Tanwal, Nawab Khan's soldier collected the tax. Azim Khan then traveled through Tanwal and then Nawab Khan's soldiers collected taxes through Azim Khan. After Azim Khan felt ashamed and was admitted to the Afghan court then the Afghans Ruler of that time sent their army.

References

Peshawar
Durrani Empire
19th century in Afghanistan
History of Pakistan
1818 in Asia